Tshiuetin (Innu for North Wind) is a 2016 Canadian short documentary film directed by Caroline Monnet.

Subject
The short concerns Tshiuetin Rail Transportation, which has a line running from Labrador to Schefferville, Quebec that came under the control of a First Nations group in December 2005, an unprecedented situation in the history of Canada. Aboriginal groups have been proud of owning the line, with the documentary attempting to convey why the line is significant.

Release and reception
The film was featured in the 2016 Toronto International Film Festival. It was nominated in the 5th Canadian Screen Awards in the short documentary category, with Monnet being among numerous Aboriginal artists nominated.

References

External links
  
Tshiuetin at Canadian Broadcasting Corporation
 , posted by Canadian Broadcasting Corporation

2016 short documentary films
Canadian short documentary films
Documentary films about rail transport
Transport in Côte-Nord
Films directed by Caroline Monnet
Documentary films about First Nations
French-language Canadian films
2010s Canadian films
2016 films